Dyschirius crinifer is a species of ground beetle in the subfamily Scaritinae. It was described by Balkenohl in 1993.

References

crinifer
Beetles described in 1993